The Blériot-SPAD S.70 was a French fighter aircraft developed in the late 1920s.

Design and development
The S.70 was the second prototype of the S.60, being a two-seat biplane fighter of all-wood construction with a canvas coating and a monocoque fuselage.

Specifications

See also

References

Fighter aircraft
Biplanes
1920s French fighter aircraft
S.70
Single-engined tractor aircraft
Aircraft first flown in 1927